Harold Kay (24 April 1897–1966) was an English footballer who played in the Football League for Barnsley, Barrow, Crewe Alexandra and Southend United.

References

1897 births
1966 deaths
English footballers
Association football midfielders
English Football League players
Barnsley F.C. players
Southend United F.C. players
Barrow A.F.C. players
Crewe Alexandra F.C. players
Mansfield Town F.C. players
Wombwell F.C. players